Gundolfo or Gundulf was a teacher of heretical Christian doctrines in the early 11th century. Of Italian origin, he turned up in the bishopric of Cambrai-Arras in northern France (south of Lille) in 1025 when Bishop Gerard of Florennes discovered that there were heretics in the diocese.

These heretics rejected the sacraments of the Catholic Church and claimed for themselves a righteousness by which alone men could be purified and attain salvation. Gundolfo taught that salvation was achieved through a virtuous life of abandoning the world, restraining the appetites of the flesh, earning food by the labor of hands, doing no injury to anyone, and extending charity to everyone of their own faith. They claimed that Gundolfo's teachings were based on the Gospels rather than on Catholic Church dogma.

Following a lengthy sermon by Gerard, the heretics recanted their errors and were received back into the Church. The unknown source of Gundolfo's teachings may be compared to Catharism and to the Waldensians. His ultimate fate is unknown.

References
Notes

Further reading
R. I. Moore, The Birth of Popular Heresy (New York: St. Martin's Press, 1975)

11th-century Christian mystics
11th-century Christian theologians
11th-century Italian people
Italian Christian mystics
Medieval Italian theologians
Christian radicalism
Heresy in Christianity in the Middle Ages